Metropolitan Sessions Judge Court is a type of sessions court that is only found in metropolitan cities of Bangladesh. Metropolitan Sessions courts only deal with the criminal cases of metropolitan areas. These courts are presided by the sessions judges. Sessions Judges are appointed by the government according to the 2009 amendment of Code of Criminal Procedure of Bangladesh.

The Code of Criminal Procedure requires the Government of Bangladesh to establish separate sessions courts for the metropolitan cities. Metropolitan Magistrate Courts are under the control and subordinate to the Metropolitan Sessions Judge Court.

Classification
Currently, a Metropolitan Sessions Judge Court has a three-tier structure, consisting
Metropolitan Sessions Judge Court
Additional Metropolitan Sessions Judge Court
Joint Metropolitan Sessions Judge Court

The Metropolitan Sessions Judge and Additional Metropolitan Sessions Judge have the same power to exercise but business of Additional Metropolitan Sessions Judge is distributed by Metropolitan Sessions Judge. The Joint Sessions Judge is subordinate to the Metropolitan Sessions Judge. The Metropolitan Sessions Judge can make rules or give special orders to the Joint Sessions Judges.

Scope of Penalty
The Code of Criminal Procedure defines penalty that judges of Metropolitan Sessions can sentence. The CrPC gives Metropolitan Sessions Judge and Additional Metropolitan Sessions Judge to pass any sentence authorized by law. But any death sentence passed by such judge needs the confirmation from the High Court Division.

Whereas CrPc enforces a few restrictions for Joint Metropolitan Sessions Judge. Joint Metropolitan Sessions Judge can pass any sentence except the death sentence or an imprisonment exceeding ten years.

References

Judiciary of Bangladesh
Law of Bangladesh
Politics of Bangladesh